Novokonstantinovka (Yañı Konstantinovka) is a rural locality (a selo) in Zelenoklinovsky Selsoviet, Alsheyevsky District, Bashkortostan, Russia. The population was 99 as of 2010. There is one street.

Geography 
Novokonstantinovka is located 45 km southeast of Rayevsky (the district's administrative centre) by road. Tavrichanka is the nearest rural locality.

References 

Rural localities in Alsheyevsky District